Alan Patrick Sutherland Synnott (b 1959) was the Church of Ireland Archdeacon of Killala and Achonry from 2010 to 2017.

Synnott was ordained in 1986. He served as
 Curate at Lisburn, 1985-1988
  a Military chaplain, 1988-1995
 Incumbent at Galloon, 1995-2000
 Incumbent at Monkstown, 2000 to 2004
 Permission to officiate, 2004-2009
 Incumbent at Skreen, 2009 to 2017
 Incumbent at Bessbrook, 2017

References

1952 births
Archdeacons of Killala and Achonry
Living people
20th-century Irish Anglican priests
21st-century Irish Anglican priests